Estonian Draughts Union (abbreviation EDF) is one of the sport governing bodies in Estonia which deals with draughts.

EDF is established on 22 April 1990 as a successor of Estonian SSR Draughts Federation. Since 1991, EDF is a member of World Draughts Federation (FMJD), and since 1998 European Draughts Federation (EDC). EDF is also a member of Estonian Olympic Committee.

References

External links
 

Sports governing bodies in Estonia